Sir Leonard Clifford William Figg  (17 August 1923 – 11 August 2014) was a British diplomat.

Figg was the son of Sir Clifford Figg, a tea and rubber planter, and was educated at Charterhouse School and Trinity College, Oxford. He served with the Royal Air Force between 1942 and 1946.

He joined the Foreign Office in 1947 and served in Addis Ababa between 1949 and 1952, Head of Chancery and Consul in Amman between 1958 and 1961, Deputy Consul-General in Chicago between 1967 and 1969, and Consul-General in Milan between 1973 and 1977. He was Assistant Under-Secretary of State at the Foreign Office from 1977 to 1980, when he was appointed Ambassador to Ireland, serving until 1983.

Figg was appointed CMG in 1974 and KCMG in 1981.

References 

1923 births
2014 deaths
People educated at Charterhouse School
Alumni of Trinity College, Oxford
Royal Air Force personnel of World War II
Royal Air Force officers
Ambassadors of the United Kingdom to Ireland
Members of HM Diplomatic Service
Knights Commander of the Order of St Michael and St George
British expatriates in Ethiopia
British expatriates in Jordan
British expatriates in the United States
British expatriates in Italy
20th-century British diplomats